Muang Kasi is a river town in Vientiane Province, Laos. It is located to the north of Ban Thieng along Route 13. The Pathet Lao were active in Muang Kasi.

References

Populated places in Vientiane Province